The 2001–02 Indiana Hoosiers men's basketball team represented Indiana University. The head coach was Mike Davis, in his second season as head coach (5th overall). The team played its home games in the Assembly Hall in Bloomington, Indiana, and was a member of the Big Ten Conference.

The Hoosiers finished the regular season with a 19–10 record, and after losing in the second round of the Big Ten tournament, earned a 5-seed in the 2002 NCAA tournament. What followed was a surprise run to the National Championship game, earning the program its eighth Final Four appearance. Though the Hoosiers lost to Maryland in the final, they upset top-seeded Duke in the Sweet 16 and took down future Indiana head coach Kelvin Sampson's 2-seed Oklahoma Sooners squad in the Final Four.

The team was led by Bloomington-native sophomore star Jared Jeffries. Other members of the team included seniors Dane Fife and Jarrad Odle, as well as another former Indiana Mr. Basketball Tom Coverdale.

Roster

Schedule/Results

|-
!colspan=8| Regular Season
|-

|-
!colspan=8| Big Ten tournament

|-
!colspan=8| NCAA tournament

Players drafted into the NBA

References

Indiana Hoosiers men's basketball seasons
Indiana
NCAA Division I men's basketball tournament Final Four seasons
Indiana
2001 in sports in Indiana
2002 in sports in Indiana